2-Thiouracil is a specific molecule consisting of a sulfated uracil.

Medical use 
The substance is a historically relevant anti-thyroid preparation. Astwood E.B. used it in 1943 as therapy of Graves' disease for the first time.  It remains in use.

Thiouracil inhibits thyroid activity by blocking the enzyme thyroid peroxidase. Its use in recent times has been replaced by advent of more potent and safer antithyroid drugs. It occurs in seeds of Brassica and Crucifera species. Thiouracil has been used as antithyroid, coronary vasodilator, and in congestive heart failure although its use has been largely supplanted by other drugs.

References 

Pyrimidines
IARC Group 2B carcinogens
Thioureas
Nucleobases